Maja Zabel is a mountain peak in the Accursed Mountains range in northern Albania and south-eastern Montenegro.

References

Mountains of Albania
Accursed Mountains